A nonperson is a citizen or a member of a group who lacks, loses, or is forcibly denied social or legal status, especially basic human rights, or who effectively ceases to have a record of their existence within a society (damnatio memoriae), from a point of view of traceability, documentation, or existence. The term also refers to people whose death is unverifiable.

Legal status
In the case of undocumented immigrants and at times foreign nationals in the United States who have entered the country legally, there are comparisons made to non-personhood due to their lack of agency and differential treatment under the law. 
Asserting that someone is a nonperson is implicitly a normative statement; by doing so, it is implied simultaneously that the person referred to is no longer entitled to the rights that any person should have. Who a person is and what every person is entitled to depends on context and social norms. For example, wards that are under the authority of a legal guardian due to infancy, incapacity, or disability are not usually considered nonpersons.

Examples
There are many possible meanings associated with the term nonperson.

Prison camps 

In Nazi extermination camps, Jewish people and Romani were treated as nonpersons. The purpose of these camps was to systematically dehumanise these unwanted peoples, use them where possible, and dispose of them efficiently. "Nonperson" status was required because it removed the moral and social obstacles for committing otherwise objectionable acts of violence, crime, abuse, rape and murder.

Unofficially missing people

Some people are covertly held by governments or other bodies, and effectively cease to exist. This happened under Pinochet's dictatorship in Chile and Argentina's last military dictatorship. It was also the guiding strategy behind the Nazi government's Nacht und Nebel (Night & Fog) policy in Western Europe. To dodge pointed questions regarding supposedly democratically controlled governments covertly holding people or employing torture, plausible deniability of knowledge might be used. The existence of ghost detainees in a secret CIA prison system is an example of this.

In North Korea, Jang Song-thaek, the uncle of Leader Kim Jong-Un, has been removed from pictures and videos since his execution.  KCNA and Rodong Sinmun began erasing references to Jang "as completely as possible", deleting some 100,000 and 20,000 news items from their websites, respectively.

See also

Damnatio memoriae
Disenfranchisement
Exile, which includes internal exile
Homo sacer
Internally displaced person
Outlaw
Persona non grata
Personhood
Stateless person

References

Human rights abuses
Historical negationism
Personhood